The semi-final of the 1970 FIFA World Cup between Italy and West Germany has been called the "Game of the Century". It was played on 17 June 1970 at the Estadio Azteca in Mexico City. Italy won 4–3 after five of the seven goals were scored in extra time, the record for most goals scored during extra time in a FIFA World Cup game. The result eliminated West Germany from the tournament while Italy went on to lose to Brazil in the final.

The match
Italy led 1–0 for the majority of the match, after Roberto Boninsegna scored in the 8th minute. West German defender Franz Beckenbauer dislocated his shoulder after being fouled, but stayed on the field carrying his dislocated arm in a sling, as his side had already used their two permitted substitutions.

Defender Karl-Heinz Schnellinger equalised for West Germany in the 90th minute. German television commentator Ernst Huberty famously exclaimed "Schnellinger, of all people!" (in German: "Schnellinger! Ausgerechnet Schnellinger!"), since Schnellinger played in Italy's professional football league, Serie A, at A.C. Milan (for whom he had never scored). It was also his first and only goal in a career total of 47 matches for the West German national team. At the end of regulation time, the score was level at 1–1, forcing the match into extra time.  Had the match remained drawn after extra time, lots would have been drawn to decide which team would progress to the final.

Gerd Müller put West Germany ahead in the 94th minute following a defensive error by Fabrizio Poletti who had just come into the game as a substitute, but Tarcisio Burgnich tied it back up only four minutes later, and then striker Gigi Riva put the Italians in front again with a superb goal. Müller scored yet again, this time with a header, for West Germany to tie the score at 3–3. Yet, as the live television coverage was still replaying Müller's goal, Italian midfielder Gianni Rivera scored what proved to be the game-winning goal in the 111th minute. Being left unmarked near the penalty area, Rivera had connected perfectly with a fine cross made by Boninsegna, clinching the victory for Italy at 4–3.

Match overview

See also
Germany–Italy football rivalry
1970 FIFA World Cup knockout stage

References

External links
 Motson, John (2006) Motson's World Cup Extravaganza GREAT GAMES: ITALY 4-3 WEST GERMANY, 1970

1970 FIFA World Cup
FIFA World Cup matches
1970
1969
Germany–Italy relations
West Germany at the 1970 FIFA World Cup
Germany
June 1970 sports events in North America
Nicknamed sporting events

sv:Världsmästerskapet i fotboll 1970#Århundradets match